Lake Waimimiha is a dune lake in the Northland Region of New Zealand. It is located to the Northeast of Ahipara in the dunes behind Ninety Mile Beach.

The lake catchment is predominantly pasture with some market gardening.

See also
List of lakes in New Zealand

References

Waimimiha
Far North District